''There is also a village called Hempstead near Stalham, also in North Norfolk.

Hempstead is a village and civil parish in the north of the English county of Norfolk. The village is 2.7 miles south-southeast of the town of Holt, and 11.2 miles west of Cromer. Hempstead is within the area covered by North Norfolk District Council. In the last Census, carried out in 2001, the population of Hempstead was counted as 179, the population slightly reducing to 177 at the 2011 Census.

In the fifteenth century the Stapleton family held the manor of Hempstead. It passed by marriage to the Calthorpe family, who remained there until the 1570s.

The Parish Church
The parish church is called All Saints’ and is unusual in the fact that the apse has a thatched roof, the main part of the roof being of pantile. At the western end of the church is a red-brick built, short tower which was rebuilt in 1744.

The church is a Grade II* listed building

Benefice and events
The church and its parish are a member of the 'Barninghman Group' and the benefice of Matlaske: a benefice containing 10 parishes under the jurisdiction of the diocese of Norwich. 
The parish holds a church fête every summer and is currently the most successful in the benefice.

References

External links

Hempstead watermill history
Hempstead village history

Villages in Norfolk
Civil parishes in Norfolk
North Norfolk